Ariffin S.M Omar is a Malaysian politician who is a Vice Chairman of the Democratic Action Party (DAP), a component party of Pakatan Harapan (PH) coalition. He served as a senator elected by the Penang State Legislative Assembly in the Parliament of Malaysia from 2 June 2015 to 2 June 2018.

Personal life and education 
Ariffin Omar studied at St Xavier's Institution, Penang for his secondary school education. He then continued to study at Universiti Sains Malaysia (USM) and later obtained a Bachelor's degree at the National University of Singapore (NUS) and in 1990, obtained a Doctorate degree from the Australia National University (ANU).

He worked as a lecturer in Universiti Sains Malaysia (1974–2006) and a lecturer at the University of Utah (1998) and was also a lecturer in  Universiti Utara Malaysia and the National Defence University of Malaysia.

He was also a founding member of Aliran Kesedaran Negara (Aliran), a reform movement dedicated to justice, freedom and solidarity.

Now based at the Penang Institute, his research focuses on nation, nationalism, ethnic relations and religious freedom.

Works 
Bangsa Melayu (Malay Concepts of Democracy and Community, 1945–1950) ; Oxford University Press, 1993
The Bumiputera Policy: Dynamics and Dilemmas ;  Penerbit Universiti Sains Malaysia, 2005

References

1949 births
Living people
Democratic Action Party (Malaysia) politicians